Poyma may refer to:
Poyma (river), a river in Primorsky Krai, Russia
Poyma (Biryusa), left tributary of the Biryusa in Irkutsk Oblast, Russia
Poyma, Russia, several rural localities in Russia
Poyma, West Kazakhstan, a village in Terekti District, West Kazakhstan Region, Kazakhstan